

Events

Pre-1600
571 BC – Servius Tullius, king of Rome, celebrates the first of his three triumphs for his victory over the Etruscans.
1034 – Máel Coluim mac Cináeda, King of Scots, dies. His grandson, Donnchad, son of Bethóc and Crínán of Dunkeld, inherits the throne.
1120 – The White Ship sinks in the English Channel, drowning William Adelin, son and heir of Henry I of England.
1177 – Baldwin IV of Jerusalem and Raynald of Châtillon defeat Saladin at the Battle of Montgisard.
1343 – A tsunami, caused by an earthquake in the Tyrrhenian Sea, devastates Naples and the Maritime Republic of Amalfi, among other places.
1400 – King Minkhaung I becomes king of Ava.
1487 – Elizabeth of York is crowned Queen of England.
1491 – The siege of Granada, the last Moorish stronghold in Spain, ends with the Treaty of Granada.
1510 – Portuguese conquest of Goa: Portuguese naval forces under the command of Afonso de Albuquerque, and local mercenaries working for privateer Timoji, seize Goa from the Bijapur Sultanate, resulting in 451 years of Portuguese colonial rule.
1596 – The Cudgel War begins in Finland (at the time part of Sweden), when peasants rebel against the imposition of taxes by the nobility.

1601–1900
1667 – A deadly earthquake rocks Shemakha in the Caucasus, killing 80,000 people.
1678 – Trunajaya rebellion: After a long and logistically challenging march, the allied Mataram and Dutch troops successfully assaulted the rebel stronghold of Kediri.
1755 – King Ferdinand VI of Spain grants royal protection to the Beaterio de la Compañia de Jesus, now known as the Congregation of the Religious of the Virgin Mary.
1758 – French and Indian War: British forces capture Fort Duquesne from French control. Later, Fort Pitt will be built nearby and grow into modern Pittsburgh.
1759 – An earthquake hits the Mediterranean destroying Beirut and Damascus and killing 30,000–40,000.
1783 – American Revolutionary War: The last British troops leave New York City three months after the signing of the Treaty of Paris.
1795 – Partitions of Poland: Stanisław August Poniatowski, the last king of independent Poland, is forced to abdicate and is exiled to Russia.
1826 – The Greek frigate Hellas arrives in Nafplion to become the first flagship of the Hellenic Navy.
1833 – A massive undersea earthquake, estimated magnitude between 8.7 and 9.2, rocks Sumatra, producing a massive tsunami all along the Indonesian coast.
1839 – A cyclone slams into south-eastern India, with high winds and a  storm surge destroying the port city of Coringa (which has never been completely rebuilt). The storm wave swept inland, taking with it 20,000 ships and thousands of people. An estimated 300,000 deaths resulted from the disaster.
1863 – American Civil War: Battle of Missionary Ridge: Union forces led by General Ulysses S. Grant break the Siege of Chattanooga by routing Confederate troops under General Braxton Bragg at Missionary Ridge in Tennessee.
1864 – American Civil War: A group of Confederate operatives calling themselves the Confederate Army of Manhattan starts fires in more than 20 locations in an unsuccessful attempt to burn down New York City.
1874 – The United States Greenback Party is established as a political party consisting primarily of farmers affected by the Panic of 1873.
1876 – American Indian Wars: In retaliation for the American defeat at the Battle of the Little Bighorn, United States Army troops sack the sleeping village of Cheyenne Chief Dull Knife at the headwaters of the Powder River.

1901–present
1905 – Prince Carl of Denmark arrives in Norway to become King Haakon VII of Norway.
1912 – Românul de la Pind, the longest-running newspaper by and about Aromanians until World War II, ceases its publications.
1915 – Albert Einstein presents the field equations of general relativity to the Prussian Academy of Sciences.
1917 – World War I: German forces defeat Portuguese army of about 1,200 at Negomano on the border of modern-day Mozambique and Tanzania.
1918 – Vojvodina, formerly Austro-Hungarian crown land, proclaims its secession from Austria-Hungary to join the Kingdom of Serbia.
1926 – The deadliest November tornado outbreak in U.S. history kills 76 people and injures more than 400.
1936 – In Berlin, Germany and Japan sign the Anti-Comintern Pact, agreeing to consult on measures "to safeguard their common interests" in the case of an unprovoked attack by the Soviet Union against either nation. The pact is renewed on the same day five years later with additional signatories.
1941 –  is sunk by a German torpedo during World War II.
1943 – World War II: Statehood of Bosnia and Herzegovina is re-established at the State Anti-fascist Council for the National Liberation of Bosnia and Herzegovina.
1947 – Red Scare: The "Hollywood Ten" are blacklisted by Hollywood movie studios.
  1947   – New Zealand ratifies the Statute of Westminster and thus becomes independent of legislative control by the United Kingdom.
1950 – The Great Appalachian Storm of 1950 impacts 22 American states, killing 353 people, injuring over 160, and causing US$66.7 million in damages (1950 dollars).
1952 – Agatha Christie's murder-mystery play The Mousetrap opens at the Ambassadors Theatre in London's West End after a premiere in Nottingham, UK.  It will become the longest continuously running play in history.
  1952   – Korean War: After 42 days of fighting, the Battle of Triangle Hill ends in a Chinese victory. American and South Korean units abandon their attempt to capture the "Iron Triangle".
1958 – French Sudan gains autonomy as a self-governing member of the French Community.
1960 – The Mirabal sisters of the Dominican Republic are assassinated.
1963 – State funeral of John F. Kennedy; after lying in state at the United States Capitol, a Requiem Mass takes place at Cathedral of St. Matthew the Apostle and the President is buried at Arlington National Cemetery.
1968 – The Old Student House in Helsinki, Finland is occupied by a large group of University of Helsinki students.
1970 – In Japan, author Yukio Mishima and one compatriot commit ritualistic seppuku after an unsuccessful coup attempt.
1973 – Georgios Papadopoulos, head of the military Regime of the Colonels in Greece, is ousted in a hardliners' coup led by Brigadier General Dimitrios Ioannidis.
1975 – Suriname gains independence from the Netherlands.
1977 – Former Senator Benigno Aquino Jr., is found guilty by the Philippine Military Commission No. 2 and is sentenced to death by firing squad. He is later assassinated in 1983.
1980 – Sangoulé Lamizana, president of Upper Volta, is ousted from power in a coup d'état led by Colonel Saye Zerbo.
1981 – Pope John Paul II appoints Joseph Cardinal Ratzinger (the future Pope Benedict XVI) Prefect of the Congregation for the Doctrine of the Faith.
1984 – Thirty-six top musicians gather in a Notting Hill studio and record Band Aid's "Do They Know It's Christmas?" in order to raise money for famine relief in Ethiopia.
1986 – Iran–Contra affair: U.S. Attorney General Edwin Meese announces that profits from covert weapons sales to Iran were illegally diverted to the anti-communist Contra rebels in Nicaragua.
  1986   – The King Fahd Causeway is officially opened in the Persian Gulf.
At least 1,036 deaths are attributed to the storm.
1992 – The Federal Assembly of Czechoslovakia votes to split the country into the Czech Republic and Slovakia, with effect from January 1, 1993.
1999 – A five-year-old Cuban boy, Elian Gonzalez, is rescued by fishermen while floating in an inner tube off the Florida coast. 
2000 – The 2000 Baku earthquake, with a Richter magnitude of 7.0, leaves 26 people dead in Baku, Azerbaijan, and becomes the strongest earthquake in the region in 158 years.
2008 – Cyclone Nisha strikes northern Sri Lanka, killing 15 people and displacing 90,000 others while dealing the region the highest rainfall in nine decades.
2009 – Jeddah floods: Freak rains swamp the city of Jeddah, Saudi Arabia, during an ongoing Hajj pilgrimage. Three thousand cars are swept away and 122 people perish in the torrents, with 350 others missing.

Births

Pre-1600
 902 – Emperor Taizong of Liao (d. 947)
1075 – Emperor Taizong of Jin (d. 1135)
1454 – Catherine Cornaro, Queen of Cyprus (d. 1510)
1467 – Thomas Dacre, 2nd Baron Dacre, Knight of Henry VIII of England (d. 1525)
1493 – Osanna of Cattaro, Dominican visionary and anchoress (d. 1565)
1562 – Lope de Vega, Spanish playwright and poet (d. 1635)
1566 – John Heminges, English actor (d. 1630)
1577 – Piet Pieterszoon Hein, Dutch admiral (d. 1629)
1587 – Sir Gervase Clifton, 1st Baronet, English politician (d. 1666)

1601–1900
1609 – Henrietta Maria of France, Queen of England, Scotland and Ireland (d. 1669)
1638 – Catherine of Braganza (d. 1705)
1666 – Giuseppe Giovanni Battista Guarneri, Italian violin maker (d. 1740)
1703 – Jean-François Séguier, French astronomer and botanist (d. 1784)
1752 – Johann Friedrich Reichardt, German composer and critic (d. 1814)
1753 – Robert Townsend, American spy (d. 1838)
1758 – John Armstrong, Jr., American general and politician, 7th United States Secretary of War (d. 1843)
1778 – Mary Anne Schimmelpenninck, English author and activist (d. 1856)
1787 – Franz Xaver Gruber, Austrian organist and composer (d. 1863)
1814 – Julius Robert von Mayer, German physician and physicist (d. 1878)
1815 – William Sawyer, Canadian merchant and politician (d. 1904)
1817 – John Bigelow, American lawyer and politician, United States Ambassador to France (d. 1911)
1835 – Andrew Carnegie, Scottish-American businessman and philanthropist (d. 1919)
1841 – Ernst Schröder, German mathematician and academic (d. 1902)
1843 – Henry Ware Eliot, American businessman and philanthropist (d. 1919)
1844 – Karl Benz, German engineer and businessman, founded Mercedes-Benz (d. 1929)
1845 – José Maria de Eça de Queirós, Portuguese-French journalist and author (d. 1900)
1846 – Carrie Nation, American activist (d. 1911)
1858 – Alfred Capus, French journalist, author, and playwright (d. 1922)
1862 – Ethelbert Nevin, American pianist and composer (d. 1901)
  1862   – Gustaf Söderström, Swedish tug of war competitor, shot putter, and discus thrower (d. 1958)
1865 – Kate Gleason, American engineer, businesswoman, and philanthropist (d. 1933)
1867 – Talaat Harb, Egyptian economist, founded the Banque Misr (d. 1941)
1868 – Ernest Louis, Grand Duke of Hesse (d. 1937)
1869 – Ben Lindsey, American lawyer and judge (d. 1934)
1870 – Winthrop Ames, American director, producer, and playwright (d. 1937)
  1870   – Maurice Denis, French painter of Les Nabis movement (d. 1943)
1872 – Robert Maysack, American gymnast and triathlete (d. 1960)
1873 – Albert Henry Krehbiel, American painter and illustrator (d. 1945)
1874 – Joe Gans, American boxer (d. 1910)
1876 – Princess Victoria Melita of Saxe-Coburg and Gotha (d. 1936)
1877 – Harley Granville-Barker, British actor, director and playwright (d. 1946)
1880 – John Flynn, Australian minister and pilot, founded the Royal Flying Doctor Service of Australia (d. 1951)
  1880   – Elsie J. Oxenham, English author (d. 1960)
1881 – Jacob Fichman, Romanian-Israeli poet and critic (d. 1958)
  1881   – Pope John XXIII (d. 1963)
1883 – Harvey Spencer Lewis, American mystic and author (d. 1939)
1887 – Nikolai Vavilov, Russian botanist and geneticist (d. 1943)
1889 – Reşat Nuri Güntekin, Turkish author and playwright (d. 1956)
1890 – Isaac Rosenberg, English soldier and poet (d. 1918)
1891 – Ōnishiki Uichirō, Japanese sumo wrestler, the 26th Yokozuna (d. 1941)
1893 – Joseph Wood Krutch, American author and critic (d. 1970)
1895 – Wilhelm Kempff, German pianist and composer (d. 1991)
  1895   – Anastas Mikoyan, Soviet politician, Chairman of the Presidium of the Supreme Soviet of the Soviet Union (d. 1978)
  1895   – Helen Hooven Santmyer, American poet and author (d. 1986)
  1895   – Ludvík Svoboda, Czech general and politician, 8th President of Czechoslovakia (d. 1979)
1896 – Albertus Soegijapranata, Indonesian archbishop (d. 1963)
  1896   – Virgil Thomson, American composer and critic (d. 1989)
1898 – Debaki Bose, Indian actor, director, and screenwriter (d. 1971)
  1898   – Aarne Viisimaa, Estonian tenor and director (d. 1989)
1900 – Rudolf Höss, German SS officer (d. 1947)
  1900   – Helen Gahagan Douglas, American actress and politician (d. 1980)

1901–present
1901 – Arthur Liebehenschel, German SS officer (d. 1948)
1902 – Eddie Shore, Canadian-American ice hockey player and coach (d. 1985)
1904 – Lillian Copeland, American discus thrower and shot putter (d. 1964) 
  1904   – Toni Ortelli, Italian composer and conductor (d. 2000)
1905 – Samiha Ayverdi, Turkish mystic and author (d. 1993)
1906 – Alice Ambrose, American philosopher and logician (d. 2001)
1907 – John Stuart Hindmarsh, English race car driver and pilot (d. 1938)
1908 – Natyaguru Nurul Momen, Bangladeshi playwright, author, educator, director and media personality (d. 1990)
1909 – P. D. Eastman, American author and illustrator (d. 1986)
1911 – Roelof Frankot, Dutch painter and photographer (d. 1984)
1913 – Lewis Thomas, American physician, etymologist, and educator (d. 1993)
1914 – Joe DiMaggio, American baseball player and coach (d. 1999)
  1914   – Léon Zitrone, Russian-French journalist (d. 1995)
1915 – Augusto Pinochet, Chilean general and politician, 30th President of Chile (d. 2006)
  1915   – Armando Villanueva, Peruvian politician, 121st Prime Minister of Peru (d. 2013)
1916 – Peg Lynch, American actress and screenwriter (d. 2015)
1917 – Luigi Poggi, Italian cardinal (d. 2010)
  1917   – Alparslan Türkeş, Cypriot-Turkish colonel and politician, Deputy Prime Minister of Turkey (d. 1997)
1919 – Norman Tokar, American director, producer, and screenwriter (d. 1979)
1920 – Shelagh Fraser, English actress (d. 2000)
  1920   – Ricardo Montalbán, Mexican-American actor, singer, and director (d. 2009)
  1920   – Noel Neill, American actress (d. 2016)
1922 – Ilja Hurník, Czech composer and playwright (d. 2013)
  1922   – Fernance B. Perry, Portuguese-American businessman and philanthropist (d. 2014)
1923 – Mauno Koivisto, Finnish banker and politician, 9th President of Finland (d. 2017)
  1923   – Art Wall Jr., American golfer (d. 2001)
1924 – Paul Desmond, American saxophonist and composer (d. 1977)
  1924   – Sybil Stockdale, American activist, co-founded the National League of Families (d. 2015)
  1924   – Takaaki Yoshimoto, Japanese poet, philosopher, and critic (d. 2012)
1926 – Poul Anderson, American author (d. 2001)
  1926   – Jeffrey Hunter, American actor and producer (d. 1969)
  1926   – Ranganath Misra, Indian lawyer and jurist, 21st Chief Justice of India (d. 2012)
1927 – John K. Cooley, American journalist and author (d. 2008)
1929 – Judy Crichton, American director and producer (d. 2007)
1931 – Nat Adderley, American cornet and trumpet player (d. 2000)
1932 – Takayo Fischer, American actress and singer
1933 – Kathryn Crosby, American actress and singer
1935 – Robert Berner, American geologist and academic (d. 2015)
1936 – Trisha Brown, American dancer and choreographer (d. 2017)
1938 – Erol Güngör, Turkish sociologist and psychologist (d. 1983)
  1938   – Rosanna Schiaffino, Italian actress (d. 2009)
1939 – Martin Feldstein, American economist and academic (d. 2019)
1940 – Reinhard Furrer, Austrian-German physicist and astronaut (d. 1995)
  1940   – Karl Offmann, Mauritian politician, 3rd President of Mauritius (d. 2022)
  1940   – Shyamal Kumar Sen, Indian jurist and politician, 21st Governor of West Bengal
  1940   – Percy Sledge, American singer (d. 2015)
1941 – Christos Papanikolaou, Greek pole vaulter
  1941   – Gerald Seymour, English journalist and author
  1941   – Riaz Ahmed Gohar Shahi, Pakistani spiritual leader and author
1942 – Bob Lind, American singer-songwriter and guitarist
  1942   – Mimis Papaioannou, Greek footballer and manager
1943 – Jerry Portnoy, American singer-songwriter and harmonica player
1944 – Ben Stein, American actor, television personality, game show host, lawyer, and author
  1944   – Michael Kijana Wamalwa, Kenyan lawyer and politician, 8th Vice President of Kenya (d. 2003)
1945 – Gail Collins, American journalist and author
  1945   – Patrick Nagel, American painter and illustrator (d. 1984)
  1945   – George Webster, American football player (d. 2007)
1946 – Marc Brown, American author and illustrator
  1946   – Mike Doyle, English footballer (d. 2011)
1947 – Jonathan Kaplan, French-American director and producer
  1947   – John Larroquette, American actor
1948 – Jacques Dupuis, Canadian lawyer and politician, 14th Deputy Premier of Quebec
  1948   – Lars Eighner, American author
1949 – Kerry O'Keeffe, Australian cricketer and sportscaster
1950 – Chris Claremont, English-American author
  1950   – Giorgio Faletti, Italian author, screenwriter, and actor (d. 2014)
  1950   – Alexis Wright, Australian author
1951 – Bucky Dent, American baseball player and manager
  1951   – Charlaine Harris, American author and poet
  1951   – Bill Morrissey, American singer-songwriter (d. 2011)
  1951   – Arturo Pérez-Reverte, Spanish author and journalist
  1951   – Johnny Rep, Dutch footballer and manager
1952 – Crescent Dragonwagon, American author and educator 
  1952   – John Lynch, American businessman and politician, 80th Governor of New Hampshire
  1952   – Gabriele Oriali, Italian footballer and manager
1953 – Graham Eadie, Australian rugby league player and coach
  1953   – Mark Frost, American author, screenwriter, and producer
  1953   – Jeffrey Skilling, American businessman 
1955 – Don Hahn, American director and producer
  1955   – Kurt Niedermayer, German footballer and manager
  1955   – Connie Palmen, Dutch author
  1955   – Bruno Tonioli, Italian dancer and choreographer
1957 – Bob Ehrlich, American lawyer and politician, 60th Governor of Maryland
1958 – Naomi Oreskes, American historian of science
1959 – Charles Kennedy, Scottish journalist and politician (d. 2015)
  1959   – Steve Rothery, English guitarist and songwriter 
1960 – Amy Grant, American singer-songwriter 
  1960   – John F. Kennedy Jr., American lawyer, journalist, and publisher (d. 1999)
1961 – Paul Comstive, English footballer (d. 2013)
1962 – Gilbert Delorme, Canadian ice hockey player and coach
  1962   – Hironobu Sakaguchi, Japanese videogame designer
  1962   – Jimon Terakado, Japanese comedian and actor
1963 – Kevin Chamberlin, American actor and director
  1963   – Holly Cole, Canadian singer and actress
  1963   – Chip Kelly, American football player and coach
1964 – Mark Lanegan, American singer-songwriter (d. 2022)  
  1965   – Cris Carter, American football player, coach, and sportscaster
1966 – Stacy Lattisaw, American R&B singer
1967 – Anthony Nesty, Surinamese swimmer
  1967   – Gregg Turkington, Australian comedian and singer
  1968   – Jill Hennessy, Canadian actress and singer
1971 – Christina Applegate, American actress
  1971   – Magnus Arvedson, Swedish ice hockey player and coach
  1971   – Göksel Demirpençe, Turkish singer-songwriter
1972 – Deepa Marathe, Indian cricketer
1973 – Steven de Jongh, Dutch cyclist
  1973   – Octavio Dotel, Dominican baseball player
  1973   – Erick Strickland, American basketball player
  1973   – Eddie Steeples, American actor, producer, and screenwriter
1974 – Kenneth Mitchell, Canadian actor
1975 – Abdelkader Benali, Moroccan-Dutch journalist and author
1976 – Clint Mathis, American soccer player and coach
  1976   – Donovan McNabb, American football player and sportscaster
  1976   – Olena Vitrychenko, Ukrainian gymnast and coach
1977 – Guillermo Cañas, Argentinian tennis player
  1977   – Marcus Marshall, Australian race car driver
1978 – Ringo Sheena, Japanese singer-songwriter and producer 
1979 – Michael Lehan, American football player
1980 – John-Michael Liles, American ice hockey player
  1980   – Josh Mathews, American wrestler and sportscaster
  1980   – Aaron Mokoena, South African footballer
  1980   – Alviro Petersen, South African cricketer
  1980   – Nick Swisher, American baseball player
  1980   – Steffen Thier, German rugby player
1981 – Xabi Alonso, Spanish footballer
  1981   – Lee Bum-ho, South Korean baseball player
  1981   – Barbara Pierce Bush, American activist
  1981   – Jenna Bush Hager, American journalist
  1981   – Jared Jeffries, American basketball player
  1981   – Chevon Troutman, American basketball player
1982 – Mitchell Claydon, Australian-English cricketer
1983 – Jhulan Goswami, Indian cricketer
1984 – Gaspard Ulliel, French actor (d. 2022)
  1984   – Peter Siddle, Australian cricketer
1985 – Remona Fransen, Dutch pentathlete
1988 – Nodar Kumaritashvili, Georgian luger (d. 2010)
  1988   – Jay Spearing, English footballer
1989 – Tom Dice, Belgian singer-songwriter
1990 – Everton Heleno dos Santos, Brazilian footballer
1991 – Philipp Grubauer, German ice hockey player
1992 – Ana Bogdan, Romanian tennis player 
1993 – Danny Kent, English motorcycle racer
2000 – Kaja Juvan, Slovenian tennis player

Deaths

Pre-1600
311 – Pope Peter I of Alexandria
 734 – Bilge Khagan, Turkic emperor (b. 683)
1034 – Malcolm II of Scotland (b. 954)
1120 – William Adelin, son of Henry I of England (sinking of the White Ship) (b. 1103)
1185 – Pope Lucius III (b. 1097)
1326 – Prince Koreyasu, Japanese shōgun (b. 1264)
1374 – Philip II, Prince of Taranto (b. 1329)
1456 – Jacques Cœur, French merchant and banker (b. 1395)
1560 – Andrea Doria, Italian admiral (b. 1466)
1565 – Hu Zongxian, Chinese general (b. 1512)

1601–1900
1626 – Edward Alleyn, English actor, founded Dulwich College (b. 1566)
1694 – Ismaël Bullialdus, French astronomer and mathematician (b. 1605)
1700 – Stephanus Van Cortlandt, American lawyer and politician, 10th Mayor of New York City (b. 1643)
1748 – Isaac Watts, English hymnwriter and theologian (b. 1674)
1755 – Johann Georg Pisendel, German violinist and composer (b. 1687)
1785 – Richard Glover, English poet and politician (b. 1712)
1865 – Heinrich Barth, German explorer and scholar (b. 1821)
1884 – Hermann Kolbe, German chemist and academic (b. 1818)
1885 – Thomas A. Hendricks, American lawyer and politician, 21st Vice President of the United States (b. 1819)
  1885   – Alfonso XII of Spain (b. 1857)

1901–present
1909 – Edward P. Allen, American lawyer and politician (b. 1839)
1920 – Gaston Chevrolet, French-American racing driver and businessman (b. 1892)
1934 – N. E. Brown, English plant taxonomist and authority on succulents (b. 1849)
1944 – Kenesaw Mountain Landis, American lawyer and judge (b. 1866)
1948 – Kanbun Uechi, Japanese martial artist, founded Uechi-ryū (b. 1877)
1949 – Bill Robinson, American actor and dancer (b. 1878)
1950 – Mao Anying, Chinese general (b. 1922)
  1950   – Johannes V. Jensen, Danish author and playwright, Nobel Prize laureate (b. 1873)
  1950   – Gustaf John Ramstedt, Finnish linguist and diplomat (b. 1873)
1956 – Alexander Dovzhenko, Ukrainian-Russian director, producer, and screenwriter (b. 1894)
1957 – Prince George of Greece and Denmark (b. 1869)
1959 – Gérard Philipe, French actor (b. 1922)
1961 – Hubert Van Innis, Belgian archer (b. 1866)
1963 – Alexander Marinesko, Russian lieutenant (b. 1913)
1965 – Myra Hess, English pianist and educator (b. 1890)
1968 – Upton Sinclair, American novelist, critic, and essayist (b. 1878)
  1968   – Paul Siple, American geographer and explorer (b. 1908)
1970 – Yukio Mishima, Japanese author, actor, and director (b. 1925)
1972 – Henri Coandă, Romanian engineer, designed the Coandă-1910 (b. 1886)
  1972   – Hans Scharoun, German architect (b. 1893)
1973 – Laurence Harvey, Lithuania-born English actor (b. 1928)
1974 – Nick Drake, English singer-songwriter and guitarist (b. 1948)
  1974   – U Thant, Burmese lawyer and diplomat, 3rd Secretary-General of the United Nations (b. 1909)
1980 – Herbert Flam, American tennis player (b. 1928)
1981 – Jack Albertson, American actor and singer (b. 1907)
1983 – Saleem Raza (Pakistani singer), Pakistani Christian playback singer (b. 1932)
1984 – Yashwantrao Chavan, Indian lawyer and politician, 5th Deputy Prime Minister of India (b. 1913)
1985 – Geoffrey Grigson, English poet and critic (b. 1905)
  1985   – Franz Hildebrandt, German pastor and theologian (b. 1909)
1987 – Harold Washington, American lawyer and politician, 51st Mayor of Chicago (b. 1922)
1989 – Alva R. Fitch, American general (b. 1907)
1990 – Merab Mamardashvili, Georgian philosopher and academic (b. 1930)
1991 – Eleanor Audley, American actress and voice artist (b. 1905)
1995 – Léon Zitrone, Russian-French journalist (b. 1914)
1997 – Hastings Banda, Malawian physician and politician, 1st President of Malawi (b. 1898)
1998 – Nelson Goodman, American philosopher and academic (b. 1906)
  1998   – Flip Wilson, American comedian, actor, and screenwriter (b. 1933)
1999 – Valentín Campa, Mexican union leader and politician (b. 1904)
2000 – Hugh Alexander, American baseball player and scout (b. 1917)
2002 – Karel Reisz, Czech-English director and producer (b. 1926)
2004 – Ed Paschke, American painter and academic (b. 1939)
2005 – George Best, Northern Irish footballer (b. 1946)
  2005   – Richard Burns, English rally driver (b. 1971)
2006 – Luciano Bottaro, Italian author and illustrator (b. 1931)
  2006   – Valentín Elizalde, Mexican singer-songwriter (b. 1979)
  2006   – Phyllis Fraser, American actress and publisher, co-founded Beginner Books (b. 1916) 
  2006   – Kenneth M. Taylor, American lieutenant and pilot (b. 1919)
2007 – Peter Lipton, American philosopher and academic (b. 1954)
2010 – Alfred Balk, American journalist and author (b. 1930)
  2010   – Peter Christopherson, English keyboard player, songwriter, and director (b. 1955)
  2010   – C. Scott Littleton, American anthropologist and academic (b. 1933)
  2010   – Bernard Matthews, English businessman, founded Bernard Matthews Farms (b. 1930)
2011 – Vasily Alekseyev, Russian weightlifter and coach (b. 1942)
  2011   – Coco Robicheaux, American singer-songwriter and guitarist (b. 1947)
2012 – Lars Hörmander, Swedish mathematician and educator (b. 1931)
  2012   – Dave Sexton, English footballer and manager (b. 1930)
  2012   – Dinah Sheridan, English actress (b. 1920)
  2012   – Jim Temp, American football player and businessman (b. 1933)
2013 – Lou Brissie, American baseball player (b. 1924)
  2013   – Ricardo Fort, Argentinian businessman (b. 1968)
  2013   – Bill Foulkes, English footballer and manager (b. 1932)
  2013   – Chico Hamilton, American drummer and bandleader (b. 1921)
  2013   – Egon Lánský, Czech journalist and politician (b. 1934)
  2013   – Al Plastino, American author and illustrator (b. 1921)
2014 – Irvin J. Borowsky, American publisher and philanthropist (b. 1924)
  2014   – Sitara Devi, Indian dancer, and choreographer (b. 1920)
  2014   – Petr Hapka, Czech composer and conductor (b. 1944)
  2014   – Denham Harman, American biogerontologist and academic (b. 1916)
2015 – O'Neil Bell, Jamaican boxer (b. 1974)
  2015   – Jeremy Black, English admiral (b. 1932)
  2015   – Svein Christiansen, Norwegian drummer and composer (b. 1941)
  2015   – Lennart Hellsing, Swedish author and translator (b. 1919)
  2015   – Elmo Williams, American director, producer, and editor (b. 1913)
2016 – Fidel Castro, Communist leader of Cuba, and revolutionary (b. 1926)
  2016   – Ron Glass, American actor (b. 1945)
2020 – Diego Maradona, Argentinian football player (b. 1960)

Holidays and observances
 Christian feast day:
 Catherine Labouré
 Catherine of Alexandria and its related observances
 Elizabeth of Reute
 Isaac Watts (Lutheran Church and Church of England)
 James Otis Sargent Huntington (Episcopal Church)
 November 25 (Eastern Orthodox liturgics)
 Independence Day, celebrates the independence of Suriname from the Netherlands in 1975.
 International Day for the Elimination of Violence against Women
 National Day (Bosnia and Herzegovina)
 Teachers' Day (Indonesia) 
 Vajiravudh Memorial Day (Thailand)

References

External links

 
 
 

Days of the year
November